Constantine Drakon is a fictional character in the DC Comics universe. He is a martial artist created by writer Judd Winick and artist Phil Hester. He is a villain and enemy of Green Arrow, and he first appeared in Green Arrow (vol. 3) #27 (2003).

The character appeared in the first episode of the TV series Arrow in 2012.

Fictional character biography

Childhood
Although his exact height has not been given, the Greek assassin Constantine Drakon is a short individual. As a child he was teased for this by other children. Once he started killing people at the age of ten, however, he found he was no longer sensitive about his stature. He claims that he had nothing strange or traumatic in his upbringing to turn him to murder, he was simply curious to see what he could do. Discovering that he was a prodigy at killing, Constantine proceeded to make a living out of it. He considers what he does not just a job but a vocation, and takes pride in the businesslike manner in which he operates.

Coming to Star City
When troll-like monsters began to terrorize the Elevast Corporation's construction sites (for a high-end retail center in a depressed area of Star City), the corporation hired Constantine Drakon. Drakon's job was to eliminate the monsters and cover up the link between them and the Elevast corporation. Oliver "Green Arrow" Queen's investigations into the monsters put him in direct confrontation with the European assassin. In their first encounter, Drakon soundly defeated Green Arrow, killing a friend of Connor Hawke (Oliver Queen's son) and crucifying Green Arrow with his own arrows, choosing not to kill the archer because he wasn't being paid enough to kill superheroes yet.

Drakon's next victim was attorney Joanna Pierce, niece of Black Lightning, who discovered information proving that an imperfect vaccine the Elevast Corporation produced had in fact turned human beings into the troll-like creatures. Joanna Pierce had recently met and become involved with Oliver Queen. Although they had broken up almost immediately after starting a relationship, her death would greatly disturb him for some time to come.

Drakon would subsequently invade the Green Arrow household looking for copies of Joanna Pierce's evidence and face Connor Hawke in battle. Connor was losing the battle badly when he received assistance from Mia Dearden (Speedy). Even then, he was only able to defeat Drakon by shooting through Mia's shoulder while Drakon was holding her hostage, and then blowing up the building with Drakon in it.

After that, Drakon did not appear until he was hired by Brick as part of a revenge scheme against Green Arrow. Drakon attacked Green Arrow's former sidekick Arsenal, cutting the young hero's throat and taking him prisoner. Mia and Connor again squared off against Drakon, who again outclassed them in martial arts skill. But the two heroes outwitted him for a second time, this time luring him into a trap set by Shift of the Outsiders.

One Year Later
Deathstroke the Terminator allowed himself to be caught by Green Arrow so that he could meet with Drakon in prison. The two of them broke out and confronted the Arrow Family. Despite being outnumbered four to one, Deathstroke comments that Team Arrow "should have brought more guys". The two of them are defeated and forced to escape when the Justice League arrives to rescue Team Arrow.

In other media
Constantine Drakon appears in the television series Arrow, portrayed by Darren Shahlavi. In the pilot episode, Drakon is introduced as Adam Hunt's head of security of Hunt Multinational company after Oliver Queen as a vigilante begins to hunt down Adam Hunt. Drakon and Oliver have a fight in the company, but Oliver manages to kill him.

References

Green Arrow characters
Characters created by Phil Hester
Characters created by Judd Winick
Comics characters introduced in 2003
DC Comics martial artists
DC Comics supervillains
Fictional assassins in comics
Fictional Greek people